Djibouti is sectioned into 5 regions and one city. It is further subdivided into 20 districts.

The regions and city are:
 Ali Sabieh Region (Région d'Ali Sabieh)
 Arta Region (Région d'Arta)
 Dikhil Region (Région de Dikhil)
 Djibouti (city) (Ville de Djibouti)
 Obock Region (Région d'Obock)
 Tadjourah Region (Région de Tadjourah)

 
Djibouti
Djibouti